Baat Bann Gayi is a Hindi comedy film directed by Shuja Ali, presented by Vibhu Agarwal and produced by Sayed Asif Jah and Megha Agarwal. It features Ali Fazal, Gulshan Grover, Anisa Butt, Amrita Raichand, Razak Khan and Akshay Singh. It was filmed in Mumbai and Singapore.

Cast
Ali Fazal as Kabir / Khoka (Double role)
Gulshan Grover as Prof. Laxmi Nivas
Anisa Butt as Rachna
Amrita Raichand as Sulochna
Razak Khan as Carlos Rehbar Pasha
 Akshay Singh

Plot
A successful author (Ali Fazal) pretends to be a geek in order to impress his girlfriend's (Anisa) brother (Gulshan Grover), because he expects his brother-in-law to be intelligent. While the hero is almost on the verge of winning over his girl's bhaiya, his rowdy lookalike shows up, adding to the drama.  Even the bhaiya has a lookalike which doubles the drama and confusion.

Soundtrack

References

External links
 
 

2010s Hindi-language films
2013 comedy films
2013 films
Indian comedy films
Hindi-language comedy films